Russell L. Ott is an American lobbyist and politician from the state of South Carolina. A member of the Democratic Party, he is the Representative for the 93rd district of the South Carolina House of Representatives. Ott is a former  Assistant Minority Leader of the House.

Early life 
Ott is a native of St. Matthews, South Carolina. He graduated from Clemson University with a Bachelor's degree in English. He received his Master of Public Administration from the University of South Carolina. He has served as a member and state convention delegate for the Calhoun County Democratic Party. Ott worked as a lobbyist for the South Carolina Farm Bureau Federation for eight years.

Political career 
Harry L. Ott, Jr., Russell's father, represented the 93rd district in the South Carolina House of Representatives, but resigned on June 30, 2013, to take a job with the Farm Service Agency. Russell declared his candidacy in the October 29 special election to fill the remainder of his father's term. He won the election, defeating Republican Charles Stoudemire. In the 2022 general election, Russell won re-election against Republican challenger Jim Ulmer.

Ott serves on the House Legislative Oversight and the Labor, Commerce and Industry Committees.

Personal 
Ott has two sons.

References

External links 

Living people
Democratic Party members of the South Carolina House of Representatives
People from St. Matthews, South Carolina
Clemson University alumni
University of South Carolina alumni
Year of birth missing (living people)
American lobbyists
21st-century American politicians